Hrozyne is a Ukrainian village in Korosten Raion (district) of Zhytomyr Oblast (province). Agricultural Institute of Polesia is located in the village.

Korosten Raion

Villages in Korosten Raion